La Llena may refer to:
La Llena Mountains, a mountain range above Tivissa, Spain
Serra de la Llena, a mountain range in the Vilanova de Prades area, Spain
Carena de la Llena, a mountain range in the Alpens area, Spain
 La Llena, a small town in Lladurs municipal term, Spain